The 2016–17 Oakland Golden Grizzlies men's basketball team represented Oakland University (OU) during the 2016–17 NCAA Division I men's basketball season. The Golden Grizzlies were led by 33rd year head coach Greg Kampe and played their home games at the Athletics Center O'rena in Rochester, Michigan as members of the Horizon League. They finished the season 25–9, 14–4 in Horizon League play to finish in a share for the Horizon League regular season championship. As the No. 1 seed, they were upset in the quarterfinals of the Horizon League tournament by Youngstown State. As a conference champion and No. 1 seed who failed to win their conference tournament, they received an automatic bid to the National Invitation Tournament where they defeated Clemson in the first round to advance to the second round where they lost to Richmond.

Oakland made a three-point field goal in every game of the season, increasing their steak to 904 consecutive games, the ninth-longest active NCAA Division I streak. They last finished a game without a three-pointer on January 30, 1988.

Off-season
Would-be senior point guard Kay Felder forwent his college eligibility and entered the 2016 NBA Draft. He was drafted in the second round by the Atlanta Hawks, who traded him to the defending champion Cleveland Cavaliers for cash considerations.

Associate head coach Saddi Washington left Oakland to become an assistant coach for the Michigan Wolverines men's basketball team while assistant coach Dionne Phelps left to return to Arizona to be with his family. Washington and Phelps were replaced by Dan Hipsher and Cornell Mann.

The Golden Grizzlies received a commitment from junior college point guard Stevie Clark. Clark transferred from Arkansas Baptist College where he played a season after being dismissed from Oklahoma State after his 2013–14 freshman year. Clark was previously a four-star recruit and was ranked the No. 68 high school senior in 2013.

Oakland also received a commitment from 22-year old, United States Army veteran Isaiah Brock. Kampe recruited Brock on an overseas coaching trip. He thought Brock was athletic, but did not have a lot of basketball experience and probably would not receive much playing time. However, he thought the team could benefit from having Brock on it. Kampe offered Brock a scholarship when his service contract was over. Initially the National Collegiate Athletic Association (NCAA) ruled Brock academically ineligible, but after the story made national news, the NCAA reconsidered and Brock was granted immediate eligibility.

Former Illinois guard Kendrick Nunn transferred to Oakland after he was removed from the team after pleading guilty to a misdemeanor battery charge. Nunn will sit out the 2016–17 season due to NCAA transfer rules and has one year of eligibility remaining for 2017–18. Nunn was named to the All-Big Ten Conference freshman team and averaged 10.6 points per game in his career at Illinois.

Guards Chris Gilbert and Alek Frascone both suffered anterior cruciate ligament (ACL) injuries and will miss the season.

2016 signing class

Season

Oakland finished in fourth place in the 2016 Great Alaska Shootout. They lost their first game to Nevada and defeated Alaska Anchorage in the consolation bracket and UC Davis in the fourth place game. Junior guard Martez Walker was named to the all-tournament team.

After their win over Robert Morris, the Golden Grizzlies improved to 9–1, their best start in Division I history. The best start in school history is 10–1 during the 1994–95 season.

During a three-game, four-day stretch in December, Oakland lost at home to Northeastern on a buzzer beater and at Michigan State in back-to-back days. Two days later, then defeated Georgia at home 86–79, in the then-fifth-highest attended game in Athletics Center O'rena history. With the win over Georgia, a member of the Southeastern Conference, Oakland is 4–2 all-time against Power Five conference schools at home.

In a low-scoring game against UIC, Oakland blocked a school and Horizon League record 18 shots, including one on the final possession to ensure a 58–57 win. The previous school record was 14 blocks, against Duquesne during the 2007–08 season. With the win, Oakland moved to 14–3 (4–0 in the Horizon League) and received a point in the Coaches Poll. They then lost four of the next five games and did not receive votes in any remaining polls.

Oakland set the all-time O'rena attendance record with 4,123 in a 93–88 upset loss against Detroit. The loss was OU's first conference loss of the season.

Awards
Brock was named Horizon League Freshman of the Week after averaging 7.3 points and 7.3 rebounds per game during the Great Alaska Shootout. Two weeks later, he received the same award again after scoring 9 points with 5 rebounds and 5 blocked shots in a win over Robert Morris. On February 6, Brock was named both the Freshman and Player of the Week. He was the first Horizon league player to receive both awards in the same week since the league began awarding a weekly newcomer in 2012. He averaged 15 points, 14 rebounds, 3 blocks and 1.5 steals per game in wins over Youngstown State and Cleveland State.

Brock was honored as a "Hometown Hero" by the National Football League's Detroit Lions during a game against the Chicago Bears. He was also honored as a veteran by the National Hockey League's Detroit Red Wings.

Hayes was named Horizon League Player of the Week January 30 after averaging 22.5 points and 12 rebounds in games against Green Bay and Milwaukee.

Walker was named Horizon League Player of the Week February 20. He averaged 22 points per game on 57% shooting in two wins over Valparaiso and UIC.

At the conclusion of the regular season, Hayes was named All-Conference First Team and Walker Second Team. Brock was named to the All-Defensive Team and All-Freshman Team.

Roster
The following table lists Oakland's roster as of November 4, 2016.

Schedule
The following is Oakland's schedule. OU defeated Grand Valley State University in a November 7 exhibition game 98–68.

|-
! colspan="9" style="background:#; color:#;"| Non-conference regular season

|-
! colspan="9" style="background:#; color:#;"| Horizon League regular season

|-
! colspan="9" style="background:#; color:#;"|Horizon League tournament

|-
! colspan="9" style="background:#; color:#;"|NIT

References

External links
 Official site
 Team statistics

Oakland Golden Grizzlies men's basketball seasons
Oakland
Oakland
Oakland Golden Grizzlies men's basketball
Oakland Golden Grizzlies men's basketball